William "Benny" Benjamin (July 25, 1925 – April 20, 1969), nicknamed Papa Zita, was an American musician, most notable as the primary drummer for the Motown Records studio band The Funk Brothers. He was inducted into the Rock and Roll Hall of Fame in 2003 and was named the eleventh best drummer of all time by Rolling Stone magazine in 2016.

Life and career

Benjamin was a native of Birmingham, Alabama. He originally learned to play drums in the style of the big band jazz groups in the 1940s.

In 1958, He was Motown's first studio drummer, where he was noted for his dynamic style. Several Motown record producers, including Berry Gordy, refused to work on any recording sessions unless Benjamin was the drummer and James Jamerson was the bassist. The Beatles singled out Benjamin's drumming style upon meeting Gordy in the UK. Among the Motown songs he performed on are early hits such as "Money (That's What I Want)" by Barrett Strong, "Shop Around" by The Miracles and "Do You Love Me" by The Contours; as well as later hits such as "Get Ready" and "My Girl" by The Temptations, "Uptight (Everything's Alright)" by Stevie Wonder, "I Heard It Through the Grapevine" by Gladys Knight & the Pips, and "Going to a Go-Go" by The Miracles.

Benjamin was influenced by the work of drummers Buddy Rich and Tito Puente. He recorded with a studio set composed of Ludwig, Slingerland, Rogers and Gretsch components and probably Zildjian cymbals.

By the late 1960s, Benjamin struggled with drug and alcohol addiction, and the fellow Funk Brothers Uriel Jones and Richard "Pistol" Allen increasingly recorded more of the drum tracks for the studio's releases. He died on April 20, 1969, of a stroke at age 43.

Notes

References

External links

10 Best Rhythm Sections of All Time – Drum! magazine
Sunday Sounds: Benny Benjamin's 'Supreme' Motown Sound – Drum! magazine
Secrets of Motown: The Tracks of Their Drums – Modern Drummer magazine

1925 births
1969 deaths
20th-century African-American musicians
20th-century American drummers
20th-century American male musicians
African-American drummers
American jazz drummers
American male drummers
American male jazz musicians
American session musicians
American soul musicians
Jazz musicians from Alabama
Musicians from Birmingham, Alabama
Rhythm and blues drummers
Soul drummers
The Funk Brothers members